M Shamsul Islam (1 January 1932 – 26 April 2018) was a  Bangladesh Nationalist Party politician, a diplomat and a Jatiya Sangsad member representing the Munshiganj-3 constituency for 4 terms. He served as the minister of information, land, commerce, food and post and telecommunications  during the first (1991–1996) and second Khaleda cabinet (2001–2006).

Career
Islam served as the general secretary of Dhaka district unit and an executive member of the  central committee of the now-defunct National Democratic Front party, led by Huseyn Shaheed Suhrawardy. He was also the general secretary of East Pakistan Family Planning Union during 1968–1971.

Islam served as the Bangladesh ambassador to Indonesia during Ziaur Rahman's ruling.

Islam was a member of the standing committee of Bangladesh Nationalist Party.

On 2 September 2007, Anti-Corruption Commission filed a  case against Islam, along with the  former Prime Minister Khaleda Zia and others on charges of awarding Global Agro Trade Company a cargo-handling deal through misuse of power. He  was later detained and freed on bail in July 2008.

Personal life
Islam was married to Anwara Sufia Islam (d. 2015). Together they had two sons including  Sayeeful Islam, a former president of the Dhaka Chamber of Commerce & Industry.

References

1932 births
2018 deaths
People from Munshiganj District
Bangladesh Nationalist Party politicians
Ambassadors of Bangladesh to Indonesia
Information ministers of Bangladesh
Land ministers of Bangladesh
Food ministers of Bangladesh
Commerce ministers of Bangladesh
State Ministers of Posts, Telecommunications and Information Technology
5th Jatiya Sangsad members
6th Jatiya Sangsad members
7th Jatiya Sangsad members
8th Jatiya Sangsad members
Place of birth missing